My Daughter Joy is a 1950 British drama film directed by Gregory Ratoff and starring Edward G. Robinson, Peggy Cummins and Richard Greene. The screenplay concerns a millionaire who spoils his only daughter, but has a strained relationship with his wife.

The film is a loose adaptation of the 1929 novel David Golder by Irène Némirovsky, which had previously been made into in a 1931 French film of the same title. It was shot at Shepperton Studios and on location in Italy. The film's sets were designed by the art director Andrej Andrejew. It was released in the United States by Columbia Pictures.

Cast
 Edward G. Robinson as George Constantin
 Peggy Cummins as Georgette Constantin
 Richard Greene as Larry
 Nora Swinburne as Ava Constantin
 Walter Rilla as Andreas
 Finlay Currie as Sir Thomas McTavish
 James Robertson Justice as Professor Keval
 Ronald Adam as Colonel Fogarty
 David Hutcheson as Annix
 Gregory Ratoff as Marcos
 Peter Illing as Sultan
 Harry Lane as Barboza
 Don Nehan as Polato
 Roberto Villa as Prince Alzar
 Ronald Ward as Doctor Schindler

See also
 David Golder (1931)

References

External links

1950 films
1950 drama films
Films directed by Gregory Ratoff
British drama films
British remakes of French films
Films about businesspeople
Films based on French novels
Films set in Italy
Films set in London
Films shot at Shepperton Studios
Films shot in Italy
British black-and-white films
1950s English-language films
1950s British films